Tom Nijssen and Cyril Suk were the defending champions, but lost in the first round to Shelby Cannon and Scott Melville.

Byron Black and Jonathan Stark won the title by defeating Brad Pearce and Dave Randall 3–6, 7–5, 6–3 in the final.

Seeds

Draw

Draw

References

External links
 Official results archive (ATP)
 Official results archive (ITF)

1993 ATP Tour